An L cut is a variant of a split edit film editing technique in which the audio from preceding scene overlaps the picture from the following scene, so that the audio cuts after the picture, and continues playing over the beginning of the next scene.

The name of the cut refers to the shape of audio and video pieces of the second of two scenes cut together when it was done on analog film and this technique has been applied since sound film first appeared.

See also 
 J cut
 Jump cut
 Match cut
 Split edit

References

Cinematography
Cinematic techniques
Film editing